Sir Richard Rothwell, 1st Baronet (c. 1628 – 1694) of Stapleford, Lincolnshire was an English Member of Parliament between 1677 and 1681.

He was the 2nd son of William Rothwell of Ewerby, Lincolnshire. He succeeded his elder brother c. 1655 and was created a baronet (of Ewerby, Lincolnshire) on 16 August 1661.

He served as Member of Parliament for Newark from 1677 to 1681.

He married in 1673, Elizabeth, the daughter of Robert Clifton and widow of Edward Rothwell of Haverholme, Lincolnshire, and with her had 2 daughters. The baronetcy thereby became extinct on his death in 1694.

References

1620s births
1694 deaths
Baronets in the Baronetage of England
English MPs 1661–1679
English MPs 1679
English MPs 1680–1681
English MPs 1681